Proyecto Akwid is the debut album of Mexican rap group Akwid, featuring Jenni Rivera & Adán "Chalino" Sánchez. Proyecto Akwid was nominated for a Lo Nuestro Award for Urban Album of the Year.

Track listing

 Un Plan (Intro)
 No Hay Manera
 Es Mi Gusto
 Taquito de Ojo (feat. Jenni Rivera)
 Pobre Compa
 Un Minutito (Insert)
 Subir Arriba
 A Pesar de Todo (feat. Adán Sánchez)
 Siempre Ausente
 Sin Ti
 Hollywooood
 Eso Es Todo (Outro)
 Bonus Track: No Hay Manera (Jason Roberts Remix)

Sales and certifications

Other product uses 

The bonus track was used in the video game Midnight Club LA Remix.

References

2003 albums
Akwid albums